Sextus Julius Frontinus (c. 40 – 103 AD) was a prominent Roman civil engineer, author, soldier and senator of the late 1st century AD. He was a successful general under Domitian, commanding forces in Roman Britain, and on the Rhine and Danube frontiers. A novus homo, he was consul three times. Frontinus ably discharged several important administrative duties for Nerva and Trajan. However, he is best known to the post-Classical world as an author of technical treatises, especially De aquaeductu, dealing with the aqueducts of Rome.

Family 
Due to a lack of either a titulus honorarius or sepulcralis, there is no outline of Frontinus' life, the names of his parents, or of his wife. Some details can be inferred from chance mentions: He is thought to be of Narbonese origins, and originally of the equestrian class. From the nomenclature of the name of Publius Calvisius Ruso Julius Frontinus (consul c. 84), it is likely Frontinus had a sister, who was the other's mother. Frontinus had at least one daughter, the wife of Quintus Sosius Senecio (cos. 99, II 107) and mother of Sosia Polla.

Career 
In AD 70, Frontinus participated in the suppression of the Rhineland revolt, and later recorded that he received the surrender of 70,000 Lingones. Between that date and being appointed governor of Britain to succeed Quintus Petillius Cerialis a few years later, Frontinus was appointed suffect consul. While governor of Britain, he subjugated the Silures of South Wales and is thought to have likewise campaigned against the Brigantes. He was succeeded by Gnaeus Julius Agricola, the father-in-law of the famous historian Tacitus, in 77. Birley believes it "is fair to speculate" that Frontinus was with Domitian during the German campaign of 83. An inscription at Hieropolis in Phrygia, as well as a number of coins of Smyrna, attests that he was proconsul of Asia in AD 86.

In 97, he was appointed curator aquarum (supervisor of the aqueducts) by the emperor Nerva, an office only conferred upon persons of very high standing. In this capacity, he followed another distinguished Roman statesman, Agrippa, the friend, ally and son-in-law of Augustus, who organised in 34 BC a campaign of public repairs and improvements, including renovation of the aqueduct Aqua Marcia and an extension of its pipes to cover more of the city.

The following year Frontinus held a second consulship as suffect in February, with Trajan as his colleague, and two years later he was made consul ordinarius with Trajan. Birley notes, "This exceptional honour underlines the high regard in which he [Frontinus] was held, and suggests, further, that Trajan had a debt to repay." He was also a member of the College of Augurs. He died in 103 or 104, a date based on Pliny the Younger writing to his friends that he was elected to the college of augurs to fill the vacancy Frontinus' death had created.

Writings

Aqueducts of Rome

Frontinus's chief work is De aquaeductu, in two books, an official report to the emperor on the state of the aqueducts of Rome.  It presents a history and description of the water-supply of Rome, including the laws relating to its use and maintenance. He provides the history, sizes and discharge rates of all of the nine aqueducts of Rome at the time at which he was writing at the turn of the 1st century AD: the Aqua Marcia, Aqua Appia, Aqua Alsietina, Aqua Tepula, Anio Vetus, Anio Novus, Aqua Virgo, Aqua Claudia and Aqua Augusta. Frontinus describes the quality of water delivered by each, mainly depending on their source, be it river, lake, or spring.

Fraud and theft
One of the first jobs he undertook when he was appointed water commissioner was to prepare maps of the system so that he could assess their condition before undertaking their maintenance. He says that many had been neglected and were not working at their full capacity. He was especially concerned by diversion of the supply by unscrupulous farmers and tradesmen, among many others. They would insert pipes into the channel of the aqueducts to tap the supply. He, therefore, made a  meticulous survey of the intake and the supply of each line, and then investigated the discrepancies. Lead pipe stamps bearing the name of the owner were also used to prevent such water theft. He was well aware of the seminal work De architectura by Vitruvius, which mentions aqueduct construction and maintenance published in the previous century; Frontinus refers to the possible influence of Vitruvius on the plumbers.

Distribution system
Distribution of the water depended in a complex way on its height entering the city, the quality of the water, and its rate of discharge. Thus, poor-quality water would be sent for irrigation, gardens, or flushing, while only the best would be reserved for drinking water. Intermediate-quality water would be used for the many baths and fountains. However, Frontinus criticized the practice of mixing supplies from different sources, and one of his first decisions was to separate the waters from each system.

Maintenance
He was very concerned by leaks in the system, especially those in the underground conduits, which were difficult to locate and mend, a problem still faced by water engineers today. The aqueducts above ground needed care to ensure that the masonry was kept in good condition, especially those running on arched superstructures. It was, he said, essential to keep trees at a distance so that their roots would not damage the structures. He reviewed the existing law governing the state aqueducts, as well as the need for enforcement of those statutes.

Military tactics
Frontinus also wrote a theoretical treatise on military science, which is lost. His extant work on military matters, the Stratagems (Latin: Strategemata), is a collection of examples of military stratagems from Greek and Roman history, for the use of generals. He draws on his own experience as a general in Germania under Domitian, but similarities between the anecdotes he records and versions of other Roman authors like Valerius Maximus and Livy suggest that he drew mainly on literary sources.  The authenticity of the fourth book has been challenged.
One example he gives of control of river water during a siege reads:

Selected editions and translations

De aquaeductu
 The standard edition of the Latin text of Frontinus' major work, with extensive commentary in English, is now R.H. Rodgers, Frontinus: De aquaeductu urbis Romae (Cambridge University Press, 2004).
 Rodgers has published his English translation online 
 An English translation by Charles E. Bennet, edited by Mary B. McElwain, has been published in the Loeb Classical Library.
 A translation by Herschel is useful for his commentary on the engineering aspects of the De aquaeductu.

Other works
 The latest edition of the Stratagems is by R. I. Ireland (Teubner, 1990 ) ; English translation in Loeb Classical Library (translated by Charles Bennet and edited by Mary B. McElwain), 1925. 
 Extracts from a treatise on land surveying ascribed to Frontinus are preserved in B. Campbell (2000), The Writings of the Roman Land Surveyors: Introduction, Text, Translation and Commentary, London.
 The Stratagems and The Aqueducts of Rome , translated by Charles E. BENNETT (1858 - 1921), available on Librivox as an audiobook.

In fiction
He  appears as a fictionalised character in the Marcus Didius Falco novels The Silver Pigs, Shadows in Bronze, Three Hands in the Fountain, and The Jupiter Myth. He also appears as a character in The Centurions novels Barbarian Princess and The Emperor's Games.

See also

 Cloaca Maxima
 Dolaucothi
 Gromatici
 List of aqueducts in the city of Rome
 List of aqueducts in the Roman Empire
 List of Roman aqueducts by date
 Quinaria
 Roman aqueducts
 Roman conquest of Britain
 Aggenus Urbicus

References

Further reading
 Ashby, Thomas (1934) The Aqueducts of Rome, Oxford.
 Blackman, Deane R., Hodge, A. Trevor (2001). Frontinus' Legacy: Essays on Frontinus' de aquis urbis Romae. University of Michigan Press. 
 Dahm, Murray K (1997), The Career and Writings of Sextus Julius Frontinus. Master's Thesis, University of Auckland.
 Herschel, C (1973) The Two Books on The Water Supply of the City of Rome of Frontinus, (trans with explanatory chapters) New England Water Works Association.
 Hodge, A.T. (2001). Roman Aqueducts & Water Supply, 2nd ed. London: Duckworth.

External links
 Frontinus at LacusCurtius: full texts of De aquis and Strategemata in Latin and English; illustrated with some of the Monscassinensis manuscript from the Herschel edition.
 
 
 
 Sextus Iulius Frontinus (fr)
 Models of Various Aqueducts of Ancient Rome
 Routes of Various Aqueducts of Ancient Rome
 Famous Fountains of Rome
 The Fountains of Rome (by Region)
 Spanish site dedicated to Roman technology, especially aqueducts and mines

40s births
Year of birth uncertain
103 deaths
1st-century Romans
1st-century writers
2nd-century Romans
Ancient Romans in Britain
Ancient Roman civil engineers
Augurs of the Roman Empire
Frontinus, Sextus
Imperial Roman consuls
Roman aqueducts
Roman governors of Britain
Roman governors of Asia
Roman military writers
Silver Age Latin writers